Close-up is an American brand of toothpaste launched in 1967 by Unilever as the first gel toothpaste. The brand is marketed worldwide by Unilever and licensed since 2003 to Church & Dwight for the North American market.

Close-Up toothpaste is also available in the Philippines, Pakistan, Peru, Argentina, Indonesia, Vietnam, Sri Lanka, India, Iran, Brazil, Russia, Nigeria, Indonesia and  Bangladesh. It is one of the top brands in terms of sales in India. The brand is positioned to target the youth segment with a lifestyle appeal in its advertising campaigns. According to an August 2016 report in The Economic Times, Close-Up was in the second spot in market share of toothpaste in India during January–June 2015 as well as January–June 2016.  

Close-Up toothpaste brand was famous and was considered as the #1 toothpaste brand in Nigeria until early 2016  when a new brand Oral-B surfaced the market by American company, Procter & Gamble, and it has been a competition between the two companies in the share of the toothpaste market in Nigeria.

See also

Close-Up Forever Summer concert deaths
List of toothpaste brands

References

Unilever brands
Church & Dwight brands
Products introduced in 1967
Brands of toothpaste